October 22 - Eastern Orthodox liturgical calendar - October 24

All fixed commemorations below celebrated on November 5 by Eastern Orthodox Churches on the Old Calendar.

For October 23rd, Orthodox Churches on the Old Calendar commemorate the Saints listed on October 10.

Saints
 Holy Apostle James, the Brother of the Lord, first Bishop of Jerusalem (c. 63)
 Venerable Petronius of Egypt, disciple of St. Pachomius the Great (346)
 Venerable Ignatios of Constantinople, Patriarch of Constantinople (877-878)
 Saint Macarius the Roman, of Mesopotamia.
 Venerable Nicephorus of Charsianos, Constantinople.

Pre-Schism Western saints
 Saints Servandus and Germanus, sons of St Marcellus of Léon in Spain, martyred in Cadiz while on their way to Tangiers under arrest (c. 305)
 Saint Amon of Toul, Second Bishop of Toul in France, the successor of St Mansuetus (4th century)
 Saint Verus, third Bishop of Salerno in Italy (4th century)
 Saint Severin of Cologne, third known Bishop of Cologne and a prominent opponent of Arianism (c. 403)
 Saint Severinus of Bordeaux (Seurin), Bishop of Bordeaux in France (c. 420)
 Saint Clether (Cleer, Clydog, Scledog, Clitanus or Cleodius), one of the twenty-four children of Saint Brychan, a Welsh saint and King of Brycheiniog (c. 520)
 Saint Severinus Boethius, a Roman senator, consul, magister officiorum, and philosopher, martyred at Pavia in Italy (524)
 Saint John of Syracuse (Ioannes), Bishop of Syracuse in Sicily from 595 (c. 609)
 Saint Romanus of Rouen, Bishop of Rouen (639)
 Saint Benedict of Sebaste, Bishop of Sebaste in Samaria, who fled to Gaul and built a hermitage near Poitiers (c.654)
 Saint Syra, a nun at Faremoutiers Abbey, from where she was asked by Bishop Ragnebaud to become Abbess of Châlons-sur-Marne (c. 660)
 Saint Leothadius (Léothade), Abbot of Moissac Abbey in the south of France, later he became Bishop of Auch (718)
 Saint Oda of Amay, Belgium (Ode)], foundress of churches (723)
 Saint Domitius, hermit near Amiens in France (8th century)
 Saint Elfleda (Aelflead), a princess who lived as an anchoress in Glastonbury Abbey; she was revered by St Dunstan (c. 936)
 Saint Ethelfleda (Elfleda), Abbess of Romsey Abbey (c. 970)

Post-Schism Orthodox saints
 Venerable Elisha (Elisæus) of Lauryshava Monastery in Belarus, Igumen (1250)

New Martys and Confessors
 New Hieromartyr Eusebius (Rozhdestvensky), Archbishop of Shadrinsk (1937)
 New Hieromartyr Vladimir Ambartsumov, Archpriest, of Moscow (1937) 
 New Hieromartyrs Nicholas Agafonnikov, Alexander Soloviev, Nicholas Archangelsky, Emilian Goncharov and Sozon Reshetilov, Priests (1937)
 Venerable Euphrosyne Timofeeva (1942)

Other commemorations
 Translation of the relics (1544) of Blessed James of Borovichi, Novgorod (1540)

Icon gallery

Notes

References

Sources
 October 23 / November 5. Orthodox Calendar (PRAVOSLAVIE.RU).
 November 5 / October 23. HOLY TRINITY RUSSIAN ORTHODOX CHURCH (A parish of the Patriarchate of Moscow).
 October 23. OCA - The Lives of the Saints.
 The Autonomous Orthodox Metropolia of Western Europe and the Americas (ROCOR). St. Hilarion Calendar of Saints for the year of our Lord 2004. St. Hilarion Press (Austin, TX). p. 79.
 The Twenty-Third Day of the Month of October. Orthodoxy in China.
 October 23. Latin Saints of the Orthodox Patriarchate of Rome.
 The Roman Martyrology. Transl. by the Archbishop of Baltimore. Last Edition, According to the Copy Printed at Rome in 1914. Revised Edition, with the Imprimatur of His Eminence Cardinal Gibbons. Baltimore: John Murphy Company, 1916. pp. 326–328.
 Rev. Richard Stanton. A Menology of England and Wales, or, Brief Memorials of the Ancient British and English Saints Arranged According to the Calendar, Together with the Martyrs of the 16th and 17th Centuries. London: Burns & Oates, 1892. pp. 511–512.
Greek Sources
 Great Synaxaristes:  23 ΟΚΤΩΒΡΙΟΥ. ΜΕΓΑΣ ΣΥΝΑΞΑΡΙΣΤΗΣ.
  Συναξαριστής. 23 Οκτωβρίου. ECCLESIA.GR. (H ΕΚΚΛΗΣΙΑ ΤΗΣ ΕΛΛΑΔΟΣ).
  23/10/2017. Ορθόδοξος Συναξαριστής. 
Russian Sources
  5 ноября (23 октября). Православная Энциклопедия под редакцией Патриарха Московского и всея Руси Кирилла (электронная версия). (Orthodox Encyclopedia - Pravenc.ru).
  23 октября по старому стилю / 5 ноября по новому стилю. Русская Православная Церковь - Православный церковный календарь на 2016 год.

October in the Eastern Orthodox calendar